The men's 800 metres event at the 1957 World University Games was held at the Stadium Charlety in Paris on 5 and 7 September 1957.

Medalists

Results

Heats

Final

References

Athletics at the 1957 World University Games
1957